From Isolation is the second studio album from Call to Preserve. Facedown Records released the album on September 30, 2008.

Critical reception

Awarding the album three and a half stars from AllMusic, Cosmo Lee states, "Despite its stylistic straitjacket, this record packs a punch." Seamus Bradley, rating the album a seven out of ten for Cross Rhythms, writes, "All in all this is a solid album from a solid band." Giving the album two and a half stars at Jesus Freak Hideout, Timothy Estabrooks describes, "From Isolation is not a great album. There is very little musical creativity or variation and it drags somewhat even with its short length. However, it is also not a terrible album."

Track listing

References

2008 albums
Facedown Records albums